Taihe is a town under the administration of Yongxing County, Hunan, China. , it administers Taihe Residential Community and the following ten villages:
Taihe Village
Yangxia Village
Yantang Village
Shuanghe Village
Dingshang Village
Wuhe Village
Wuluo Village
Qilang Village
Sibian Village
Lianyu Village

References 

Towns of Chenzhou
Yongxing County